Frazier is a Scottish surname. Notable people with the surname include:


A 
Adam Frazier (born 1991), American baseball player

B 
Brenda Frazier (1921-1982), American “celebutante” socialite during the Depression era

C 
Calvin Frazier (1915–1972), American blues guitarist, singer and songwriter
Charles Frazier (born 1950), American historical novelist

D 
Dallas Frazier (1939-2022), American country musician and songwriter
Darnella Frazier, American awardee of 2021 Pulitzer Prize Special Citations and Awards

E 
E. Franklin Frazier (1894-1962), American sociologist

J 
Jackson Frazier (born 1994), American baseball player
James Frazier (1940-1981), American orchestral conductor
James B. Frazier (1856-1937), U.S Senator from Tennessee, 1905-1911
Jeff Frazier (born 1982), American baseball player
Jim Frazier (born 1940), Australian inventor, naturalist, and cinematographer
Joe Frazier (1944–2011), American heavyweight boxing champion
Joshua Frazier (born 1995), American football player

K 
Kavon Frazier (born 1994), American football player
Kendrick Frazier (1942-2022), American science writer; magazine editor
Kenneth Frazier, (born 1954), American business executive; president and CEO of pharmaceutical maker Merck & Co.
Kevin Frazier, (born 1964), American television host and actor

L 
LaGaylia Frazier (born 1961), American-born, Swedish singer
LaToya Ruby Frazier (born 1982), American contemporary artist
Lynn Frazier (1874-1947), U.S. Senator from North Dakota, 1923-1941

M 
Marvis Frazier (born 1960), American heavyweight boxer; son of Joe Frazier
Michael Frazier II (born 1994), American basketball player
Michele Baldwin (1966-2012) born Michele Frazier also known as Lady Ganga, stand up paddled 700 miles down the Ganges River to raise awareness of Cervical Cancer

N 
Nelson Frazier, Jr. (1971–2014), American professional wrestler best known as Viscera

O 
Owsley Brown Frazier (1935–2012), American businessman and philanthropist

S 
Sam Frazier, Jr. (born 1944), American lyricist and blues singer 
Sheila Frazier (born 1948), American television and film actress

T 
Todd Frazier (born 1986), American baseball player
Tommie Frazier (born 1974), American football player and coach
Tim Frazier (born 1990), American basketball player

W 
Walt Frazier (born 1945), American basketball player and sportscaster
Willie Frazier (1942–2013), American football player

See also
Frazier Island, Nunavut
Frazier History Museum in Louisville, Kentucky
Frazier, Georgia
Frazier, Missouri
Frazier Park, California
Frazier Park (Charlotte, North Carolina)
Frazier School District in Western Pennsylvania
Frazer (disambiguation)
Fraser (disambiguation)
Frasier (disambiguation)

Scottish surnames